This is a list of lists of black holes:

 List of black holes.
 List of most massive black holes
 List of nearest known black holes

See also
 Lists of astronomical objects

Lists of astronomical objects